The rings is an artistic gymnastics event held at the Summer Olympics. The event was first held for men at the first modern Olympics in 1896. It was held again in 1904, but not in 1900, 1908, 1912, or 1920 when no apparatus events were awarded medals. The rings was one of the components of the men's artistic individual all-around in 1900, 1908, and 1912, however. The men's rings returned as a medal event in 1924 and has been held every Games since. Rings scores were included in the individual all-around for 1924 and 1928, with no separate apparatus final. In 1932, the rings was entirely separate from the all-around. From 1936 to 1956, there were again no separate apparatus finals with the rings scores used in the all-around. Beginning in 1960, there were separate apparatus finals.

Medalists

Men

Multiple medalists

Medalists by country

Gallery

References

Rings
Rings at the Olympics